Matteo Lovato (born 14 February 2000) is an Italian professional footballer who plays as a centre-back for Serie A club Salernitana.

Club career

Early years
Lovato spent his early years in the youth teams of Padova before moving to Genoa's under-17 team at age 16, where he made 18 appearances and scored two goals. Lovato did not join Genoa's Primavera team, though; he returned to Padova on loan in January 2018.

On 25 August 2019, Lovato made his Serie C debut with Padova under coach Salvatore Sullo, as a starter in a 3–1 away victory against Virtus Verona. He would remain with the club for the first half of the 2019–20 season, accumulating 18 appearances in all competitions.

Hellas Verona
On 31 January 2020, Hellas Verona announced the acquisition of Lovato for a reported fee of €500,000. He made his Serie A debut with the club on 18 July 2020 under coach Ivan Jurić as a late substitute for Koray Günter in a 1–1 home draw against Atalanta.

The next season, Lovato broke into the starting lineup following the sale of Marash Kumbulla. He made a total of 24 appearances for Verona, helping the club to a 10th-place finish.

Atalanta
On 31 July 2021, Lovato signed for Atalanta on a four-year contract, for a reported fee of €8 million plus €3 million in bonuses.

Loan to Cagliari
On 3 January 2022, Lovato joined Cagliari on loan until the end of the 2021–22 season.

Salernitana
Lovato joined Salernitana on 6 July 2022 on a five-year contract, as part of a deal in which Éderson moved the other way.

International career
On 12 November 2020, Lovato made his debut with the Italy U21 playing as a starter in a qualifying match won 2–1 against Iceland in Reykjavík.

Career statistics

Club

References

External links
 

Living people
2000 births
Sportspeople from the Province of Padua
Italian footballers
Footballers from Veneto
Association football defenders
Italy under-21 international footballers
Serie A players
Serie C players
Calcio Padova players
Hellas Verona F.C. players
Atalanta B.C. players
Cagliari Calcio players
U.S. Salernitana 1919 players